Keratosis punctata of the palmar creases is a common skin disorder that occurs most often in black patients, with skin lesions that are 1 to 5mm depressions filled with a comedo-like keratinous plug.

Treatment with etretinate has been described.

See also
 Skin lesion

References

Papulosquamous hyperkeratotic cutaneous conditions